Hypofluorous acid, chemical formula HOF, is the only known oxyacid of fluorine and the only known oxoacid in which the main atom gains electrons from oxygen to create a negative oxidation state.  The oxidation state of the oxygen in hypofluorites is 0. It is also the only hypohalous acid that can be isolated as a solid. HOF is an intermediate in the oxidation of water by fluorine, which produces hydrogen fluoride, oxygen difluoride, hydrogen peroxide, ozone and oxygen. HOF is explosive at room temperature, forming HF and O2:

2 HOF → 2 HF + O2

It was isolated in the pure form by passing F2
gas over ice at −40 °C, collecting the HOF gas, and condensing it:
F2 + H2O → HOF + HF

The compound has been characterized in the solid phase by X-ray crystallography as a bent molecule with an angle of 101°.  The O–F and O–H bond lengths are 144.2 and 96.4 picometres, respectively.  The solid framework consists of chains with O–H···O linkages. The structure has also been analyzed in the gas phase, a state in which the H–O–F bond angle is slightly narrower (97.2°).

Among workers in thiophene chemistry, a solution of hypofluorous acid in acetonitrile (generated in situ by passing gaseous fluorine through acetonitrile that has water in it) is commonly known as Rozen's reagent.

Hypofluorites
Hypofluorites are formally derivatives of OF−, which is the conjugate base of hypofluorous acid.  One example is trifluoromethyl hypofluorite (CF3OF).

See also
 Hypochlorous acid, a related compound that is more technologically important but has not been obtained in pure form.

References

Halogen oxoacids
Triatomic molecules
Hydrogen compounds
Hypofluorites
Mineral acids